Htet Phyo Wai (born 21 January 2000) is a Burmese professional footballer who plays as a winger. He scored his first international goal for Myanmar against Laos in 2018 AFF Championship.

Htet Phyo Wai scored two more goals for Myanmar in the 2020 AFF Championship against Philippines. He also signed for highly-reputable club Yangon United and has already scored two goals.

Career

Shan United
Shan United registered Htet Phyo Wai for both Shan United senior team and U21 team.

International goals
Scores and results list Myanmar's goal tally first.

Honours

Club
Shan United 
Myanmar National League
Winners (1):  2019
Runners-up (1): 2018
General Aung San Shield
Champions (1): 2017
Runners-up (1): 2019

References

2000 births
Living people
People from Sagaing Region
Burmese footballers
Myanmar international footballers
Association football forwards
Shan United F.C. players
Competitors at the 2019 Southeast Asian Games
Southeast Asian Games medalists in football
Southeast Asian Games bronze medalists for Myanmar
Competitors at the 2021 Southeast Asian Games